Jan Hendrik Leopold (May 11, 1865 – June 21, 1925) was a Dutch poet and classicist.

Leopold was born at 's-Hertogenbosch, Netherlands. After living in Arnhem he moved to Rotterdam early in 1892, where he became a teacher of classical languages at the Gymnasium Erasmianum.

He translated portions of The Rubaiyat of Omar Khayyam into Dutch.

He died in Rotterdam. The school commemorates him with a bronze and stone monument including his portrait and one of his poems.

Works 

 Studia Peerlkampiana (1892) 
 Ad Spinozae opera posthuma (1902) 
 Stoïsche wijsheid (1904) 
 M. Antonius Imperator (1908) 
 Uit den tuin van Epicurus (1910) 
 Verzen (1912) 
 Cheops (1916) 
 Oostersch (1924) 
 Verzen II (1926)

External links 

 Koninklijke Bibliotheek - J.H. Leopold
 Digitale Bibliotheek Nederlandse Letteren - J.H. Leopold

Dutch male poets
People from 's-Hertogenbosch
1865 births
1925 deaths